Stigmella svenssoni is a moth of the family Nepticulidae. It is widespread, but localised in the northern half of Europe, with records from Norway, Sweden, Finland, Denmark, Latvia, the Netherlands, Germany, Slovakia, Hungary and France. There are two isolated records from northern Italy and northern Greece. Only leafmines are recorded from Ireland.

The wingspan is 6–7 mm. The thick erect hairs on the head vertex are orange-yellow. The collar is white. Antennal eyecaps are white. The forewings are coarse, bronze-brown with a slight purple luster at the tip. The hindwings are grey. The male has a yellowish anal tip.
  
Adults are on wing from May to June.

The larvae feed on Quercus petraea and Quercus robur. They mine the leaves of their host plant. The mine consists of a long, broad corridor. The frass line is of inconstant width, mostly occupying more than half the width of the gallery.

External links
Fauna Europaea
bladmineerders.nl
The Quercus Feeding Stigmella Species Of The West Palaearctic: New Species, Key And Distribution (Lepidoptera: Nepticulidae)
UKmoths
Swedish moths
Stigmella svenssoni images at  Consortium for the Barcode of Life

Nepticulidae
Moths of Europe
Moths described in 1971